The 2019–20 Boston University Terriers men's basketball team represented Boston University during the 2019–20 NCAA Division I men's basketball season. The Terriers, led by ninth-year head coach Joe Jones, played their home games at Case Gym as members of the Patriot League. They finished the season 21–13, 12–6 in Patriot League play to finish in a tie for second place. They defeated Navy, Bucknell and Colgate to be champions of the Patriot League tournament. They received the Patriot League's automatic bid to the NCAA tournament. However, the NCAA Tournament was cancelled amid the COVID-19 pandemic.

Previous season 
The Terriers finished the 2018–19 season 15–18, 7–11 in Patriot League play to finish in a three-way tie for seventh place. As the No. 8 seed in the Patriot League tournament, they defeated Loyola (MD) in the first round before losing to top-seeded Colgate in the quarterfinals.

Roster

Schedule and results

|-
!colspan=9 style=| Non-conference regular season

|-
!colspan=9 style=| Patriot League regular season

|-
!colspan=9 style=| Patriot League tournament

|-
!colspan=9 style=| NCAA tournament

References

Boston University Terriers men's basketball seasons
Boston University
Boston University Terriers men's basketball
Boston University Terriers men's basketball
Boston University Terriers men's basketball
Boston University Terriers men's basketball